Felip Jhon Suson (born January 12, 1997), also known by his stage name Ken and by his mononym Felip, is a Filipino singer, songwriter, dancer, and producer. He is the main dancer and lead vocalist of the Filipino boy band SB19 managed under ShowBT Philippines. He is the founder of record label FELIP, and is the CEO, creative director and lead designer for fashion brand Superior Son.

Early life and education 
Felip Jhon Suson was born on January 12, 1997, in Pagadian, the capital city of the province of Zamboanga del Sur, Philippines. He is the second-born child, and has an older sister. He originally wanted to be an architect, but decided to pursue dancing. He studied architecture at the Technological Institute of the Philippines.

Career

2018: SB19 
On July 15, 2018, Ken was introduced as the fifth member of ShowBT Entertainment's new boy group, SB19. He became the main dancer and lead vocalist of the group. He has co-written and released track with SB19: "Go Up" (2018).

2021: Solo activities 
On September 18, Ken just made his official solo debut with “Palayo” (Away). He goes by the mononym Felip for his solo project, explores a left-field R&B direction in “Palayo,” a marked departure from the high-octane pop style his band's well known for. The Vispop track dropped with a self-executive-produced companion visual (called “mood film”) starring himself in high-fashion ensembles.

On November 26, Ken launched his self-established clothing line called “Superior Son”.

On December 19, HipHopDX Asia, an online magazine of hip hop music included "Palayo" on the list of the Top 20 best hip hop and R&B Songs of Asia.

2022–present: Bulan 
On May 28, Ken released his new single "Bulan", a comeback single under his mononym Felip. It was originally due for release on May 15 in conjunction with a rare blood moon phenomenon. "Bulan" was written and composed by Felip. Compared to his debut single "Palayo", a chill, smooth R&B and sexy groovy Vispop track. "Bulan" is more experimental and aggressive sound, reminiscent of hip-hop tracks that are often used in krumping with influence of rock music and mix with Filipino ethnic elements. It talks about recognizing that powerful being within and not letting other people consume their own light. It shows the darker, more confrontational side of self-love. It is also about how negativity is being normalized.

"Bulan" music video features the Paoay sand dunes and the Graciano Cliffs along Cape Bojeador in Ilocos Norte.  The backdrop for the battle between darkness and light, taking inspiration from the Philippine mythology deities like moon-god, Bulan and masked-warrior moon goddess, Haliya and mythological creature sea serpent-like dragon, Bakunawa. The music video is a metaphor for real-world issues and Felip's journey about crab mentality and how other people try to tear down those who are trying to pursue their dreams and how he chooses to respond to the negativity he receives.

On July 5, Felip performed his newest single, "Bulan," at The Recording Academy Grammy's online series Global Spin, which celebrates global music, international artists, and the world's sounds. He is the first Filipino act and P-pop artist and the first Pilipino Music  featured on the Grammy's Global Spin live series. 

On February 3, Felip has release and unveiled his first-ever solo EP, COM•PLEX via Warner Music.

Artistry 
Ken has the deepest voice out of all SB19 members. He has received critical praise for his unique bass voice, vocal fry, falsetto, and emotional range as a singer. And he can play the guitar and piano as well. Ken's music inspirations are Daniel Caesar a Canadian singer and songwriter, Filipino rock band, IV of Spades and Filipino rapper Al James. He admires Japanese rock band One Ok Rock and EXOs soloist Kai. He has always been vocal in his past interviews that he also appreciate the music style of Post Malone, Lay, and Jaden Smith.

Public image 
Becoming a self-made fashion icon, Ken is the most experimental among SB19 members when it comes to his style choices. He blurs the lines of menswear and womenswear every chance that he can get. On the 2021 Village Pipol Choice Awards, Ken brought home the Fashion Influencer of the Year award for two consecutive year.

Discography

Extended plays

As a lead artist

Production credits 
All song credits are adapted from the Tidal, unless otherwise noted.

Videography

Music video

Awards and nominations

References 

SB19 members
1997 births
Living people
Filipino singer-songwriters
ShowBT Entertainment artists
Sony Music Philippines artists
Warner Music Philippines artists
English-language singers from the Philippines
21st-century Filipino male singers
Filipino male pop singers
Filipino male dancers
Filipino male models
Filipino dance musicians